Yannick Eckmann (born November 30, 1993) is an American road and cyclo-cross cyclist. He represented his nation in the men's elite event at the 2016 UCI Cyclo-cross World Championships in Heusden-Zolder.

References

External links
 
 
 

1993 births
Living people
Cyclo-cross cyclists
American male cyclists
Place of birth missing (living people)